Bruno Giordano Sanzin (14 February 1906, in Trieste – 12 January 1994) was an Italian poet. He was one of the principal writers featured in the Futurist magazine, L'auroro, Revista mensile de arte e de vita published from December 1923 to October 1924.

References

1906 births
1994 deaths
Writers from Trieste
Italian male poets
Futurist writers
20th-century Italian poets
20th-century Italian male writers